Butaperazine (Repoise, Tyrylen) is a typical antipsychotic of the phenothiazine class. It was approved in 1967, and possibly discontinued in the 1980s.

Synthesis

2-Butyrylphenothiazine [25244-91-1] (1) is the requisite starting material for carrying out the procedure. It is prepared in a manner that is synonymous with the method used in the propiomazine and propiopromazine already discussed. 
The 1-(γ-chloropropyl)-4-methylpiperazine [104-16-5] (2) is prepared in the conventional way from alkylating 1-methylpiperazine and 1-Bromo-3-chloropropane. 
Sodamide is used to extract the 10-H thereby facilitating the nucleophilic substitution reaction. And completing the instalment of the sidechain.

See also 
 Typical antipsychotic
 Phenothiazine

References 

Phenothiazines
Piperazines
Aromatic ketones
Typical antipsychotics
Propyl compounds